Germans in Sweden, alternatively known as German Swedish people are Swedes of full or partial German descent residing in Sweden. In 2020, there were 51,434	 people living in Sweden born in Germany. Around 29,000 German citizens live in Sweden as of 2021.

Notable people

References 

 
Ethnic groups in Sweden
Germany–Sweden relations